Allan Roy Mansoor (born June 16, 1964) is an American politician and former member of the California State Assembly. He is a Republican who represented the 74th district, encompassing a northwestern part of Orange County. Prior to being elected to the state assembly, he was the Mayor of Costa Mesa.  In 2014, he sought election to the Orange County Board of Supervisors, but lost the election to state Board of Equalization member Michelle Park Steel.

Mansoor's father was an antiquities dealer and a member of the Coptic Orthodox Church from Egypt and his mother was originally from Åland.

AllanMansoor.com domain lapse and subsequent trademark lawsuit

In February 2017, the OC Weekly reported that Mansoor's personal website had been purchased by a "John Doe" after Mansoor allowed the registration to expire. Mansoor's website was altered to a blog that reviewed pornographic websites with titles such as Backroom Facials and Ass Parade. Mansoor brought a lawsuit in federal court for trademark infringement against the anonymous purchaser of his domain.

References

External links 
 Campaign website
 Join California Allan Mansoor

1964 births
American deputy sheriffs
American people of Coptic descent
American people of Swedish descent
American people of Finnish descent
California city council members
Living people
Mayors of places in California
Republican Party members of the California State Assembly
People from Costa Mesa, California
People from Redwood City, California
21st-century American politicians